The 1921 Westhoughton by-election was held on 5 October 1921.  The by-election was held due to the death of the incumbent Labour MP, William Wilson.  It was won by the Labour candidate Rhys Davies.

Result

References

Westhoughton
Westhoughton by-election
1920s in Lancashire
Westhoughton 1921
Westhoughton 1921
Westhoughton 1921
Westhoughton